This is a list of works for American rock musician Cary Brothers.

Studio albums 
 Who You Are (2007)
 Under Control (2010)
 Bruises (2018)

EPs 
 All the Rage (December 14, 2004)
 Waiting for Your Letter (September 20, 2005)
 Ride (March 25, 2008)
 Father Christmas (November 17, 2009)
 Covers Volume One (May, 2012)
 Let Me Be (May 14, 2013)
 Lovin' on You (February 3, 2015)
 Covers Volume Two (July 15, 2016)

Contributions 
 Joshua Radin – Co-producer of the EP First Between 3rd and 4th
 Joshua Radin – Producer of "Winter" from We Were Here
 Tiësto  – Vocals/Co-Write on "Here On Earth" from the album Kaleidoscope
 Jim Bianco – Background Vocals on "Sing" and "If Your Mama Knew" from the album Sing
 Jim Bianco – Member of the choir on "Sinners" from the album Loudmouth
 Jessie Baylin – Background Vocals on "Leave Your Mark" from the album Firesight
 Ben Lee – Background Vocals on "What's So Bad (About Feeling Good)?" from the album The Rebirth of Venus
 Greg Laswell – Background Vocals on multiple tracks from the album Take A Bow
 Kele Okereke (of Bloc Party) / Tiësto – Harmonies on "It's Not The Things You Say" from the album Kaleidoscope
 The Scene Aesthetic – Background Vocals/Co-Write on "Lonely Girl" from the album Brother
 Swiss American Federation – Vocals/Co-Write on "Oxygen" from S.A.F.'s EP (2011)
 Cosmic Gate – Vocals/Co-Write on "Wake Your Mind" from the album Wake Your Mind (2011)
 Cosmic Gate – Vocals/Co-Write on "Start to Feel" from the album Start to Feel (2014)

Song appearances

Film 
 Garden State Soundtrack (2004) (song: "Blue Eyes")
 Sky High Soundtrack (2005) (song: "True")
 SherryBaby Soundtrack (2006) (song: "Loneliest Girl in the World")
 The Last Kiss Soundtrack (2006) (song: "Ride")
 Feast of Love Soundtrack (2007) (song: "Honestly")
 Easy A Soundtrack (2010) (song: "If You Were Here")
 Where We're Meant to Be (2016) (song: "Someday")
 The Secret Life Of Kyle from the Despicable Me 3 DVD (2017) (song: "True")
 The Croods: A New Age (2020) (song: "True")

Television 
 Grey's Anatomy
"Begin the Begin" (2006) (song: "Ride")
"Forever Young" (2007) (song: "The Last One")
"Superfreak" (2010) (song: "Belong")
"Go It Alone" (2014) (song: "Something About You")
 Scrubs
"My First Kill" (2004) (song: "Blue Eyes")
"My Last Chance" (2004) (songs: "Honestly" and "Something")
"My Best Laid Plans" (2005) (songs: "Honestly", "Waiting For Your Letter")
"Her Story II" (2006) (song: "Ride")
 ER
"Strange Bedfellows" (2006) (song: "Ride")
 Cold Case
"Witness Protection" (2009) (song: "If You Were Here")
 Psych
"Murder?... Anyone?... Anyone?... Bueller?" (2008) (song: "If You Were Here")
 One Tree Hill
"Hundred" (2008) (song: "Ride")
"Don't You Forget About Me" (2010) (song: "If You Were Here")
"I Can't See You, But I Know You're There" (2010) (songs: "Belong" and "Can't Take My Eyes Off You")
"Nobody Taught Us to Quit" (2010) (song: "Alien")
"Anyone Who Had A Heart" (2012) (song: "Free Like You Make Me")
 Kyle XY
"Pilot" (2006) (songs: "Supposed to be" and "Ride")
"Sleepless in Seattle" (2006) (song: "Honestly")
"Blame It on the Rain" (2006) (song: "All the Rage")
"The First Cut is the Deepest" (2008) (song: "The Glass Parade")
 Eli Stone
"Father Figure" (2008) (song: "All The Rage")
 Bones
"The Man in the Wall" (2005) (song: "Something")
 Smallville
"Aqua" (2005) (song: "Waiting For Your Letter")
"Harvest" (2010) (song: "Can't Take My Eyes Off You")
 Greek
"The Popular Vote" (2008) (song: "Wasted One")
"From Rushing With Love" (2008) (song: "Something")
 Pretty Little Liars
"Can You Hear Me Now" (2010) (song: "Ride")
"Save The Date" (2011) (song: "Alien")
 Make It or Break It
"If Only..." (2010) (song: "Alien")
 Cougar Town
"All Mixed Up" (2010) (song: "Belong")
90210
"Holiday Madness" (2010) (song: "Belong")
The Lying Game
"Bad Boys Break Hearts" (2011) (song: "Ride")
Life Unexpected
"Affair Remembered" (2011) (song: "Belong")
The Vampire Diaries
"Homecoming" (2011) (song: "Free Like You Make Me")
"Smells Like Teen Spirit" (2011) (song: "Take Your Time")
"O Come, All Ye Faithful" (2012) (song: "O Holy Night")
"A View To A Kill" (2013) (song: "If You Were Here")
"Graduation" (2013) (song: "Belong")
"I Know What You Did Last Summer" (2013) (song: "Run Away")
"Because" (2015) (song: "Can't Take My Eyes Off You")
Switched at Birth
"Game On." (2012) (song: "Belong")
Private Practice
"Good Grief" (2012) (song: "Ordinary World")
Beauty and the Beast
"Insatiable" (2013) (song: "Free Like You Make Me")

TV appearances 

 Talking Marriage with Ryan Bailey - December 3, 2014
 Jimmy Kimmel Live! -  February 29, 2008
 The Late Late Show with Craig Ferguson - September 27, 2007
 Scrubs - My First Kill (2004)
 The Late Late Show with Craig Kilborn - September 20, 2004

References 

Discographies of American artists
Rock music discographies